Isotope 217° is a Chicago-based band composed mainly of members from Tortoise and the Chicago Underground Orchestra that was formed in 1997. The New York Times described the band as "..adept to varying degrees at rock and funk and jazz and electronics, turn those introspective moments into jams that are messier and warmer than Tortoise's."

Discography

References 

Musical groups established in 1997
American jazz ensembles from Illinois
Musical groups from Chicago
Jazz musicians from Illinois